Chisum is a 1970 American Western film directed by Andrew McLaglen, starring John Wayne in the titular role, and adapted for the screen by Andrew J. Fenady from his short story "Chisum and the Lincoln County War." The supporting cast features Forrest Tucker, Christopher George, Ben Johnson, Glenn Corbett, Andrew Prine, Bruce Cabot, Patric Knowles, Richard Jaeckel, Lynda Day George, Pedro Armendariz Jr., John Agar, John Mitchum, Ray Teal, Christopher Mitchum and Hank Worden with Geoffrey Deuel and Pamela McMyler receiving "introducing" credits. The picture was filmed in Panavision and Technicolor.

Chisum is based on the Lincoln County War of 1878 and, although it changed a number of details, many of the historical figures in the film (such as Chisum, Tunstall, McSween, Murphy, Brady, Evans, Garrett, and Billy the Kid) were in the New Mexico Territory at the time and did play a part in the conflict.

Plot
In Lincoln County, New Mexico, John Chisum, a kindly and successful cattle baron, finds his peace threatened when amoral Lawrence Murphy and his business partner James Dolan forcibly buy up most of the land and businesses in the area. Initially, Chisum tries to not get involved, though he does allow ranchers forced out by Murphy to water their herds on his land.

Bribed by Murphy, corrupt Sheriff Brady secretly hires Neemo and his group of banditos, who kill two of Chisum's men and steal a herd of horses. Chisum and his men pursue the thieves, retrieve the horses, and discover the American money in the Mexican outlaw's pocket. They are assisted by Billy "The Kid" Bonney, a notorious killer who was recently hired and given a chance to reform by John Henry Tunstall, Chisum's philanthropic British neighbor.

Chisum's niece Sallie arrives in Lincoln to live with her uncle, and Billy begins to court her. Alexander McSween, invited by Murphy to be his lawyer, arrives with his wife Sue on the same stagecoach. During Sallie's welcome party, Murphy sends Jess Evans and his gang to rustle Chisum's beeves, which are being taken to the United States Army to feed the Native Americans on a nearby reservation. A wandering Pat Garrett warns Chisum's men of the approaching riders; during the subsequent shootout, one of Chisum's wranglers dies and the cows stampede away. Chisum sends for Justice J.B. Wilson to try Murphy's men for murder, but the damage is done and the Army starts buying its beeves from Murphy. McSween, not liking Murphy's methods, switches sides.

McSween, Tunstall, and Chisum open a new store and bank to combat Murphy's monopoly. Billy, Garrett, and several of Chisum's men go to Santa Fe to get supplies to stock the store. Billy is nearly killed when Murphy has Evans attack the wagon train as it is returning to Lincoln; in response, Tunstall decides to go to Santa Fe to ask Governor Axtell to intervene in the land war. Deputies Morton and Baker stop Tunstall on the road, falsely accuse him of rustling, shoot him dead, and plant a gun so it looks like Tunstall drew first.

Justice Wilson arrives in Lincoln during Tunstall's funeral. Brady refuses to go after his own men, so Wilson deputizes Chisum and Garrett, and they track and capture the fugitive deputies in a nearby town. On the way back, Chisum separates from the group to get the judge. Billy, wanting revenge for his friend and mentor, and skeptical that justice will be done in Lincoln, knocks out Garrett and kills Morton and Baker. He then rides into town, publicly murdering Brady before fleeing. Murphy convinces Governor Axtell to fire Justice Wilson and appoint bounty hunter Dan Nodeen, who harbors an old grudge against Billy, as sheriff.

While a large posse scours the countryside to find Billy, he gathers his allies, starting with two of Tunstall's wranglers, Charlie Bowdre and Tom O'Folliard. They break into McSween's store to get dynamite to rob Murphy's bank, but Nodeen notices them inside, and a protracted firefight breaks out between Murphy's and Billy's men. McSween, unarmed and wanting no part of the battle, asks that he and his wife be allowed to leave, but only Sue is allowed to go. When the shooting resumes, she flees to get Chisum, so Murphy has his men erect barricades in the streets of the town. McSween comes out to bargain with Murphy, and Nodeen shoots him in cold blood.

Chisum and his men arrive in Lincoln, driving Murphy's own cattle before them to break through the barricades. Murphy's men are defeated, with Billy personally pursuing and killing Evans. Chisum gets into a fistfight with Murphy, ending with both men falling from a balcony. Murphy is impaled on a decorative bull's horn he was using as a weapon; Nodeen, his paymaster dead, leaves town, pursued by Billy.

Garret and Sallie begin a relationship. He is appointed Sheriff of Lincoln County, and the next governor of the territory, Lew Wallace, declares amnesty for those involved in the land war. With peace restored, Chisum goes up a hill to survey his land.

Cast

 John Wayne as John Chisum
 Forrest Tucker as Lawrence Murphy
 Christopher George as Dan Nodeen
 Ben Johnson as James Pepper
 Glenn Corbett as Pat Garrett
 Andrew Prine as Alex McSween
 Bruce Cabot as Sheriff Brady
 Patric Knowles as Henry Tunstall
 Richard Jaeckel as Jess Evans
 Lynda Day as  Sue McSween
 Geoffrey Deuel as Billy "The Kid" Bonney
 Pamela McMyler as Sallie Chisum
 John Agar as Amos Patton
 Lloyd Battista as Neemo
 Robert Donner as Morton
 Ray Teal as Justice J.B. Wilson
 Edward Faulkner as James Dolan
 Ron Soble as Charlie Bowdre
 John Mitchum as Baker
 Glenn Langan as Colonel Nathan Dudley
 Alan Baxter as Governor Samuel Beach Axtell
 Alberto Morin as Juan Delgado
 Bill Bryant as Jeff
 Pedro Armendáriz Jr. as Ben
 Christopher Mitchum as Tom O'Folliard
 John Pickard as Sergeant Braddock
 Abraham Sofaer as Chief White Buffalo
 Gregg Palmer as Karl Riker
 Hank Worden as Stationmaster Elwood
 Pedro Gonzalez Gonzalez as Mexican Rancher

Production
The film was based on a screenplay by Andrew J. Fenady called Chisum and the Lincoln County Cattle War. Originally set up at 20th Century Fox, the project moved to Warner Bros.-7 Arts in August 1969 because John Wayne wanted to make the film that year, but Fox's production schedule was full. Michael Wayne, John's son and the film's executive producer, took on the project of making Chisum because he felt the story summed up his father's political views. As is the case with many of Wayne's films, in this, his 200th starring role, the sizeable cast is packed with familiar faces from earlier John Wayne films, among them Sands of Iwo Jima (Wayne, John Agar, Forrest Tucker, and Richard Jaeckel).

The picturesque vistas in the film were captured by cinematographer William H. Clothier in Durango, Mexico, where the film was shot. John Wayne was on the set of Chisum when he heard he was nominated for the Academy Award for Best Actor for his work in True Grit, an award he would go on to win.

During filming, John Mitchum, brother of Robert, introduced John Wayne to his patriotic poetry. Seeing that Wayne was greatly moved by Mitchum's words, Forrest Tucker suggested Mitchum and Wayne should collaborate to record some of the poetry, which eventually resulted in the Grammy-nominated spoken-word album, America, Why I Love Her (1973).

The song "The Ballad of John Chisum", which is heard during the opening credits of the film, features verses spoken by William Conrad, while the song heard later in the film, "Turn Me Around", is sung by Merle Haggard.

Box office and reception
The film premiered in Dallas, Texas, on June 24, 1970. It grossed $6 million at the box office.

U.S. President Richard Nixon commented on the film during a press conference in Denver, Colorado, on August 3, 1970. In doing so, he used the film as a context to explain his views on law and order:

Director Andrew V. McLaglen called the film one of his favorites and said: "I wanted Billy the Kid to just be Billy the Kid, a human being, not a bad little boy. Fenady was sort of a scholar about the Lincoln County Cattle War, which was a conflict over water and cattle—trading cattle—and John Chisum actually became a very powerful landowner. It was an American story."

Home media
Warner Home Video released Chisum on Blu-ray on June 7, 2016.

See also
 List of American films of 1970
 John Wayne filmography

References

External links
 
 
 
 
 

1970 films
1970 Western (genre) films
American Western (genre) films
Lincoln County Wars
Films directed by Andrew McLaglen
Films produced by John Wayne
Films scored by Dominic Frontiere
Films set in New Mexico
Films set in the 1870s
Batjac Productions films
Warner Bros. films
1970s English-language films
Cultural depictions of Billy the Kid
Cultural depictions of Pat Garrett
1970s historical films
American historical films
Biographical films about Billy the Kid
1970s American films